This is a list of massacres during or immediately after the Finnish Civil War. The Finnish Civil War was a conflict in 1918, which killed more than 38,000 people (about one percent of the country's population), of whom 1,650 were victims of Red Terror, and over 10,000 of White Terror.

See also
 List of massacres in Finland

References 

Finnish Civil War
Finnish Civil War